Manic depression is a historical term for bipolar disorder, a mental illness.

Manic depression may also refer to:

 "Manic Depression" (song), by Jimi Hendrix and covered by many artists